Lesmo is a comune (municipality) in the Province of Monza and Brianza in the Italian region Lombardy, located about  northeast of Milan.

Lesmo borders the following municipalities: Casatenovo, Triuggio, Correzzana, Camparada, Arcore, Macherio, Biassono.

References

The town is currently administered by Lesmo Amica with Roberto Antonioli as mayor and Marco Fumagalli as vice mayor.

External links
 www.lesmo.org